is a town in Rauma Municipality in Møre og Romsdal county, Norway. Åndalsnes is in the administrative center of Rauma Municipality. It is located along the Isfjorden, at the mouth of the river Rauma, at the north end of the Romsdalen valley.

Åndalsnes has an association football club, Åndalsnes IF. The local church is Grytten Church, but its actually located across the river in Veblungsnes. The harbour is called "Tindekaia", and is visited every year by many cruise ships.

Geography
Åndalsnes is located at the mouth of the river Rauma, at the shores of the Romsdalsfjord, one of the first Norwegian rivers to host English fly fishermen in the nineteenth century. The river's salmon population is currently undergoing restoration after seeing strong declines in the 1980s following an infestation of Gyrodactylus salaris, a freshwater fish parasite that mainly affects salmon. As with many other infested rivers, the Rauma is experiencing an increase in the population of sea trout.

The river flows through the Romsdalen valley, which features some of the most spectacular scenery in the entire country. It was an early launch site for European BASE jumpers.

Transportation
The European route E136 highway and Norwegian County Road 64 pass through Åndalsnes. County Road 64 heads to the towns of Molde and Kristiansund to the north and the E136 highway heads to the town of Ålesund to the west and to Dombås to the southeast.

Trains on the Rauma Line terminate at the port of Åndalsnes, with bus connections to the nearby towns of Molde and Ålesund.

History
The village of Åndalsnes was the administrative centre of the old municipality of Grytten from 1838 until 1964, when Grytten was merged with several other municipalities to form the new Rauma Municipality. Åndalsnes then became the administrative centre of the new municipality of Rauma.

During World War II, after the German invasion of Norway in April 1940, British troops landed in Åndalsnes as a part of a pincer movement to take the mid-Norwegian city of Trondheim. The northern arm of the attack was based in Namsos. Lacking control of the air, the forces at Åndalsnes were withdrawn in early May 1940.

At the waterfront here, rigs were built to develop off-shore oil and gas wells in the North Sea, with the railroad bringing steel, etc.to the water's edge, and the rigs taken out to sea, past Ålesund, through the fiord waters. 

In 1996, the municipal council of Rauma Municipality declared Åndalsnes a town.

Media
The newspaper Romsdalsbladet was published in Åndalsnes from 1947 to 1948.

The town's newspaper, Åndalsnes Avis, had a circulation of 4,125 in 2007.

Notable people
Notable people that were born or lived in Åndalsnes include:
 Kitty Lossius, teacher and novelist

Gallery

See also

List of towns and cities in Norway

References

Cities and towns in Norway
Populated places in Møre og Romsdal
Rauma, Norway
Romsdal